Etta Jones Sings (aka Etta Jones Sings with Junior Mance and Kenny Burrell) is an album by jazz vocalist Etta Jones which was recorded in 1965 and released on the Roulette label.

Track listing 
 "Moon Man" (Henry Glover, Morris Levy) – 2:15
 "My Coloring Book" (Fred Ebb, John Kander) – 3:10
 "Did I Remember" (Walter Donaldson, Harold Adamson)	1:54
 "I Had a Man" (Mark Barkan, Don Christopher) – 4:25
 "Swinging Shepherd Blues" (Kenny Jacobson, Moe Koffman, Rhoda Roberts) – 2:13
 "I Was Telling Him About You" (Morris Charlap, Don George) – 2:30
 "Lonely Crowd" (Glover, Levy) – 2:35
 "Well A'lright O.K. You Win" (Mayme Watts, Sid Wyche)	 – 2:24
 "I've Got It Pretty Bad" (Henry Johnson) – 2:27
 "Wonder Why" (Nicholas Brodszky, Sammy Cahn) – 2:16
 "Late Late Show" (Murray Berlin, Roy Alfred) – 2:14
 "Tess's Torch Song (I Had A Man)" (Harold Arlen, Ted Koehler) – 3:17

Personnel 
Etta Jones – vocals
Junior Mance – piano
Kenny Burrell – guitar 
Frank Wess – tenor saxophone, flute
Joe Newman – trumpet 
Milt Hinton – bass 
Mike Mainieri – vibraphone
Aliner Jackson – drums
George Berg – baritone saxophone

References 

Etta Jones albums
1966 albums
Roulette Records albums